Ego Sum is a comic book trilogy written and illustrated by Italian artist Simone Bianchi. The first volume was published on 16 January 2004 in Italy, France, Canada and Luxembourg. The second volume was published in April 2005.

References

Italian comics titles